Trillium ludovicianum, the Louisiana wakerobin or Louisiana trillium, is a species of flowering plant in the family Melanthiaceae. It is found only in the south-central United States, in Louisiana, Mississippi, and eastern Texas.

Trillium ludovicianum is a perennial herbaceous plant up to 12 inches (30 cm) tall. Flowers are dark red, purple, or dark green, sometimes with irregular markings. The plant grows in moist woods and floodplains.

Bibliography

References

External links
 
 United States Department of Agriculture, National Forest Service
 Pacific Bulb Society, Trillium Species Two photos of several species
 Biodiversity Information Serving Our Nation (BISON) occurrence data and maps for Trillium ludovicianum
 

ludovicianum
Endemic flora of the United States
Flora of Louisiana
Flora of Mississippi
Flora of Texas
Plants described in 1901
Flora without expected TNC conservation status